Anantram Jaiswal  (1 April 1924 - 7 January 2015) was a Freedom fighter and Indian politician  was also s Member of Parliament of India. He was a member of the 6th Lok Sabha and was also a member of the Uttar Pradesh Legislative Assembly. Jaiswal represented the Faizabad constituency of Uttar Pradesh now known as  Ayodhya, he was also a member of the Member of Parliament, Rajya Sabha ,was also the opposition leader of Janata Party.

Early life and education
Anantram Jaiswal was born in village Chandwara, Barabanki in the state of Uttar Pradesh. He attended the Government Inter College in the city of Faizabad and subsequently attained BA & LL.B degrees Jaiswal worked as an advocate prior to joining politics.

Political career
Anantram Jaiswal entered active politics in the 1950s. Although he was a member of the Janata Party, he was previously associated with three other political parties; viz Socialist Party, Samyukta Socialist Party and Bharatiya Lok Dal. Whilst with Samyukta Socialist Party, he became a member Uttar Pradesh Legislative Assembly for two terms and was also Leader of Samyukta Socialist Party in the Assembly from 1969 to 1974. Jaiswal joined the Janata Party in the mid 1970s. Jaiswal was a  senior leader of Janata Party and also was a Uttar Pradesh State President of Janata Party. He was also a Samajwadi Party Ideologist along with Ram Manohar Lohia ,Chandra Shekhar,

Jaiswal held several key posts and was also a Minister & State President in the Government of Uttar Pradesh, He had represented many leaders like Mulayam Singh Yadav.

Imprisonment
Between the 1960s–1970s, Jaiswal was imprisoned five times on various counts. Some grounds of imprisonment were participating in campaigns for removal of statues of British rulers, price rise, for grant of fair wages and clearness allowance to the government servants and teachers, for redistribution of land to the landless etc. In 1975, he was also detained for 19 months for Maintenance of Internal Security Act.

Personal life

Posts held

See also

6th Lok Sabha
Government of India
Lok Sabha
Parliament of India
Politics of India
Uttar Pradesh Legislative Assembly
Faizabad (Lok Sabha constituency)
Janata Party

References 

India MPs 1977–1979
Janata Party politicians
Lok Sabha members from Uttar Pradesh
People from Faizabad district
People from Barabanki district
Members of the Uttar Pradesh Legislative Assembly
1924 births
2015 deaths
Samyukta Socialist Party politicians
Bharatiya Lok Dal politicians
Janata Dal politicians
Janata Dal (Secular) politicians